The 2020–21 season is the 133rd competitive association football season in India.

National teams

India national football team

2022 FIFA World Cup qualification

Group E

Friendlies

India women's national football team

Turkish Women's Cup

Friendlies

AFC competitions

2021 AFC Champions League

Group stage
FC Goa qualified for the group stage but did not advance to knockout stage.

Group E

2021 AFC Cup

Preliminary round 2 

|+South Asia Zone

Club competitions

Indian Super League

Regular season

Play-offs

I-League

I-League 2nd Division

Final Round

Indian Women's League

References

 
Football
Football
India
India
Seasons in Indian football